RWD domain-containing protein 3 is a protein that in humans is encoded by the RWDD3 gene.

References

Further reading